Bill Robinson (Born 1948 - died: 16 December 1993, New York City) was an American fashion designer. He was known for his "pioneering soft-shouldered jackets with slim waists, arresting combinations of just-off colors, and zippers going up the fronts of his vests."

Early life and education
Robinson  was born and raised in Philadelphia and was a graduate of Parsons School of Design.

Career
Before having his own label, Robinson worked for Anne Klein, Valentino, Stan Herman, Leo Narducci, Gloria Vanderbilt, Calvin Klein (chief menswear designer), and Yves St. Laurent.

Personal life
Robinson's companion was Leo Chiu.

References

1948 births 
1993 deaths
American fashion designers
American fashion businesspeople
People from Philadelphia
Menswear designers
LGBT fashion designers
20th-century LGBT people